Mohammad Helme bin Panjang (born 24 May 1983) is a Bruneian retired footballer and coach who played as a midfielder. He made four appearances for the Brunei national football team in 2001.

Club career

Helme was one of the first players signed to DPMM FC, the club founded by Prince Al-Muhtadee Billah, even before the B-League was created. He exclusively played for DPMM throughout their four-year local stint, winning two B-League championships, one FA Cup and two Super Cups, and in addition becoming the B-League Young Player of the Year in 2002. He also briefly captained the side in the absence of Ali Momin before later relinquishing it to Rosmin Kamis.

DPMM replaced the Brunei national representative team that competed in the Malaysian Premier League starting from the 2005–06 season. With former Brunei coach Ranko Buketa favouring the likes of Rosmin Kamis and Yussof Salleh over Helme, he found limited opportunities under the Croatian head coach, mostly appearing from the substitutes' bench. His side gained promotion and was even placed third in their top-flight debut, but Helme had minimal input. It was only when Yordan Stoykov took over in the 2007-08 season that Helme saw more game time. Ultimately, in a tumultuous period for DPMM which saw them move to the Singaporean league and then subject to a FIFA ban, Helme was not retained for the 2009 season, instead being replaced by namesake Helmi Zambin.

After a few years away from the game, Helme joined Kasuka FC, a reformed team that were to compete in the Brunei Premier League in 2015. He gained promotion with Kasuka and played with them for another season in the Brunei Super League until transferring to Temburong-based side Lun Bawang FC in 2017.

International career

Due to eye-catching performances for DPMM FC in local tournaments, Zainuddin Kassim drafted Helme into the national squad for the 2002 World Cup qualifying matches to be held in April–May 2001. Helme was in the starting lineup for four of the games, all ending in defeats.

Helme also played for the Brunei under-20s at the 2002 AFC Youth Championship qualification matches in South Korea in March 2002, as well as Brunei under-21s at the 2005 Hassanal Bolkiah Trophy.

Coaching career

In 2022 Helme was appointed head coach of DPMM FC for the 2022 Brunei FA Cup, occupying the seat made vacant by Adrian Pennock. He coached DPMM all the way to the final of the competition on 4 December. His team were victorious against Kasuka FC in that final, bringing DPMM's second FA Cup triumph which Helme first won as a player in 2004.

Honours

Team
DPMM FC
Brunei Premier League (2): 2002, 2004
Brunei FA Cup: 2004
Brunei Super Cup: 2002, 2004

Head Coach
DPMM FC
Brunei FA Cup: 2022

Individual
B-League Young Player of the Year: 2002

References

External links

1983 births
Living people
Association football midfielders
Bruneian footballers
Brunei international footballers
DPMM FC players